Ivana Ivchevska (born 15 October 1988) is a Macedonian alpine skier. She competed in two events at the 2006 Winter Olympics.

References

1988 births
Living people
Macedonian female alpine skiers
Olympic alpine skiers of North Macedonia
Alpine skiers at the 2006 Winter Olympics
Sportspeople from Skopje